Whoso Is Without Sin is a 1916 British silent drama film directed by Fred Paul and starring Hilda Moore, Milton Rosmer and Flora Morris. The screenplay concerns a woman who offers shelter to a prostitute.

Premise
An extravagant woman has a change of heart after her husband commits suicide. She offers shelter to a prostitute and protects her from an angry mob.

Cast
 Hilda Moore - Mary Linton 
 Milton Rosmer - The Vicar 
 Flora Morris - Alice Repton 
 Ronald Squire - Roger Markham 
 Arthur M. Cullin - John Linton 
 Laurence Leyton - James

References

External links
 

1916 films
British drama films
British silent feature films
Films directed by Fred Paul
1916 drama films
Ideal Film Company films
British black-and-white films
1910s English-language films
1910s British films
Silent drama films